...quando tu mi spiavi in cima a un batticuore... is a studio album by Italian singer Mina, released on November 1970 by PDU.

Track listing

Arranged by Augusto Martelli, except for "Insieme" (Detto Mariano), "Una donna, una storia" and "Questa cosa chiamata amore" (Gianni Ferrio).

Charts

References

External links
 

1970 albums
Italian-language albums
Mina (Italian singer) albums